WQXT-CD, virtual channel 22 (UHF digital channel 29), is a low-powered, Class A Retro TV-affiliated television station licensed to St. Augustine, Florida, United States. The station is owned by A1A TV. Its studios are located in St. Augustine's tallest building, Cathedral Place, in the heart of the historic district. Its broadcast footprint covers from Jacksonville to Palm Coast.

External links

Retro TV affiliates
QXT-CD
Television channels and stations established in 1988
1988 establishments in Florida